Phyllis Mudford King (23 August 1905 – 27 January 2006) was an English female tennis player and the oldest living Wimbledon champion when she died at age 100.

Phyllis Evelyn Mudford was born in 1905 in Wallington, Surrey. She was educated at Sutton High School, where she was Captain of Tennis, and one of the school's four houses is named in her honour. She won the Wimbledon Ladies' Doubles Championship in 1931 with partner Dorothy Shepherd-Barron, and last took part in the tournament in 1953.

In 1931, she won the singles title at the Kent Championships after defeating Dorothy Round in the final in straight sets. In 1934, she again won the title beating Joan Hartigan in the final. She played for Britain in the Wightman Cup in 1930, 1931, 1932 and 1935.

Marriage
Mudford married Maurice Richard King in 1932.

Grand Slam finals

Doubles (1 title, 1 runner-up)

References

1905 births
2006 deaths
English centenarians
British female tennis players
Wimbledon champions (pre-Open Era)
Grand Slam (tennis) champions in women's doubles
People educated at Sutton High School, London
English female tennis players
Tennis people from Greater London
Women centenarians